Karatoya River (also spelt Korotoa River) is a small stream in Rajshahi Division of Bangladesh.

Etymology
The name of the river is formed of two Sanskrit words kar (hand) and toa (water).

Course
The Karatoya, known as Phuljhur rises in the Baikunthapur jungles in the extreme north-west of Jalpaiguri district (West Bengal, India) and forms for some distance the boundary between Dinajpur and Rangpur districts. It, then, meanders through Rangpur and Bogura. In the south of Bogura district, it receives the Halhalia and the united stream is then known as Phuljhur. It leaves Bogura at Chanda kona and flowing in a southerly direction past Raiganj and Shujapur is joined by the Ichhamati at Nalka. After this junction, it takes the name of Hurasagar and passing close by Shazadpur and Hera joins the Jamuna near Bera.

Course changes
 
The Karatoya is one of the rivers that has changed over the years. Previous rivers that the Karatoya connected to include the Teesta and Kosi rivers.

The map (right) shows the main rivers in North Bengal and adjoining areas. Not shown are numerous tributaries and distributaries, which connect the main rivers, and allow the main rivers to change course. Therefore, the river-system pattern undergoes continuous changes. Such changes have not been reflected in the map. Moreover, many of the rivers have local names for sections of the course, adding to the complexity of the river system.

The Karatoya is made up of four parts and connects adjoining rivers.

History
The Karatoya is mentioned in the Puranas and had a high repute for sanctity. It was the eastern boundary of the old kingdom of Pundravardhana, the country of the Paundras. In the classical period, it formed the western boundary of Kamarupa, and later the Kamata kingdom. It is shown in Van Den Brouk's map of Bengal (C, 1660) as flowing into the Ganges and in fact. before the destructive floods of 1787 it brought down to the Atrai and to the Ganges a great volume of Teesta water. Since the main stream of the Teesta was diverted to the east in 1787, the Karatoya and the Phuljhur have gradually silted up. and they are at the present day rivers of minor importance. Traces of an old channel, for which the name of the Karatoya is claimed, are also pointed out in the Chatmohar thana, where it appears to have been obliterated by the Baral.

During the early 1100s, the Ganges was three times smaller than the Karatoya according to the Siyar-al-Mutakhkhirin. By the late 1600s, the river had become a channel according to a map by Ven den Brouck. During the late 1700s, James Rennell created additional maps.

References

External links

Karatoya River
International rivers of Asia
Rivers of Rajshahi Division